Robert Leslie Thomas "'R.L.T." Galbraith (1841 – May 12, 1924) was an Irish-born merchant and political figure in British Columbia. He represented Kootenay in the Legislative Assembly of British Columbia from 1877 to 1886.

Biography
Robert Leslie Thomas was born in Raphoe, County Donegal in 1841, the son of Professor Galbraith, of Scottish descent. He was educated at the Royal College there. In 1870, he came to Fort Steele on the Kootenay River, at that time known as Galbraith's Ferry, to join his brother John who was operating a ferry and general store there.

Galbraith was first elected to the assembly in an 1877 by-election held following the death of William Cosgrove Milby. He was chairman of the assembly's Committee of Ways and Means and Supplies. Galbraith later served as justice of the peace and was Indian agent for the southeast part of the province. He became known as the "Grand Old Man of the Kootenays".

In 1913, at the age of 72, Galbraith married Ella Fleming, a 39-year-old woman from England.

Robert Leslie Thomas Galbraith died in Fort Steele on May 12, 1924.

References

External links
 

1841 births
1924 deaths
Politicians from County Donegal
Irish emigrants to pre-Confederation British Columbia
Independent MLAs in British Columbia
People educated at the Royal and Prior School